Quercus × cerrioides is a hybrid oak species in the family Fagaceae. The tree is endemic to Spain. It is a conservation dependent plant threatened by habitat loss. Its parent are Q. canariensis and Q. pubescens subsp. subpyrenaica. Both parents are placed in section Quercus.

See also

Quercus afares
Mediterranean conifer and mixed forests

References

cerrioides
Endemic flora of Spain
Trees of Europe
Flora of the Balearic Islands
Environment of Mallorca
Natural history of Catalonia
Aragon
La Rioja (Spain)
Navarre
Conservation dependent plants
Near threatened biota of Europe
Taxonomy articles created by Polbot
Taxobox binomials not recognized by IUCN